Killingbeck and Seacroft is an electoral ward of Leeds City Council in east Leeds, West Yorkshire, covering both of the outer city suburb areas of Killingbeck and Seacroft and the north west part of Cross Gates.

Councillors since 1973 

 indicates seat up for re-election.
 indicates seat up for election following resignation or death of sitting councillor.
 indicates councillor defection.
* indicates incumbent councillor.

Elections since 2010

May 2022

May 2021

May 2019

May 2018

May 2016

May 2015

May 2014

May 2012

May 2011

May 2010

See also
Listed buildings in Seacroft and Killingbeck

Notes

References

Wards of Leeds